Liam James (born August 7, 1996) is a Canadian actor, known for his role as Noah Curtis in the 2009 film 2012, young Shawn Spencer on the USA Network television series Psych, and the lead character, Duncan, in 2013's The Way, Way Back. He also starred as Jack Linden in AMC's The Killing and Adam Warren in ABC's The Family, playing the son of main characters.

James is from Vancouver, British Columbia. He has heterochromia iridum with one green and one blue eye.

Filmography

Film

Television

Awards and nominations

References

External links
 

1996 births
Living people
Canadian male child actors
Canadian male film actors
Canadian male television actors
Male actors from Vancouver
21st-century Canadian male actors